Andrei Alekseyevich Sosnitskiy (born 8 November 1962) is a Belarusian professional football coach and a former player. He is the manager of the Russian club Kuban Krasnodar.

As a player, he made his professional debut in the Soviet Second League in 1981 for FC Baltika Kaliningrad. During his coaching years he worked closely with Leonid Kuchuk, serving as his assistant in a number of teams.

Honours

As coach
Sheriff Tiraspol
Moldovan National Division champion: 2009–10
Moldovan Cup winner: 2009–10

References

1962 births
Living people
People from Sovetsk, Kaliningrad Oblast
Sportspeople from Kaliningrad Oblast
Soviet footballers
Russian footballers
Belarusian footballers
Belarus international footballers
Association football defenders
Russian Premier League players
FC Baltika Kaliningrad players
FC Dinamo Minsk players
FC Spartak Vladikavkaz players
FC Ural Yekaterinburg players
FC Chernomorets Novorossiysk players
FC Dynamo Brest players
FC Slavia Mozyr players
Belarusian expatriate footballers
Expatriate footballers in Russia
Belarusian football managers
Belarusian expatriate football managers
Expatriate football managers in Moldova
Belarusian expatriate sportspeople in Moldova
FC Sheriff Tiraspol managers
Expatriate football managers in Ukraine
Belarusian expatriate sportspeople in Ukraine
Expatriate football managers in Russia
Belarusian expatriate sportspeople in Russia
FC Kuban Krasnodar managers
Russian Premier League managers
FC Dynamo Brest managers
FC Slavia Mozyr managers
FC Urozhay Krasnodar managers
Moldovan Super Liga managers